Francisco Javier Ibáñez Campos (born 13 January 1986) is a Chilean footballer.

Club career
He began his career in the youth system of Universidad de Chile before making his debut in the 2006 with Palestino.

External links
 
 

1986 births
Living people
Chilean footballers
Chilean expatriate footballers
Club Deportivo Palestino footballers
Cobreloa footballers
O'Higgins F.C. footballers
A.C. Barnechea footballers
Unión La Calera footballers
San Marcos de Arica footballers
Deportes Concepción (Chile) footballers
Deportes Temuco footballers
Deportes Copiapó footballers
Primera B de Chile players
Chilean Primera División players
Expatriate footballers in Mexico
Association football forwards